José Paulo Bezerra Maciel Júnior (born 25 July 1988), known as Paulinho, is a Brazilian professional footballer who plays as a midfielder for Sport Club Corinthians Paulista. He is also a former Brazil international, making 56 caps between 2011 and 2018.

Club career

Early career
Paulinho began his playing career with Pão de Açúcar, joining the youth squad in 2004. After failing to break through into the first team, Paulinho joined Lithuanian side FC Vilnius in 2006. He played well for the club during his two seasons in Lithuania, scoring five goals from 38 domestic appearances, but at the end of the 2007 LFF Lyga campaign, FC Vilnius were relegated to the second division and Paulinho left the club where he moved to Poland, signing for Ekstraklasa side ŁKS Łódź. Following one season in Poland where Paulinho made 17 league appearances, he returned to Brazil and his first club Pão de Açúcar in the summer of 2008. After a single successful season, Paulinho was on the move again, joining Série B side Bragantino in 2009.

Corinthians
In 2009, playing for Bragantino, he drew the attention of São Paulo giants Corinthians, and was signed by the club. His first league goal for the club came on 30 May 2010, coming off the bench to score Corinthians's fourth goal, sealing a 4–2 win over state rivals Santos. He would eventually go on to win important competitions with the São Paulo side, such as the 2011 Brasileirão and the 2012 Copa Libertadores, cementing himself as a hero for his club. Along the way to the Copa Libertadores final, Paulinho netted the only goal of the two-legged quarter-final tie against fellow Brazilian side Vasco da Gama, scoring in the 87th minute of the second leg on 23 May 2012 to send Corinthians into the semi-finals.

On 10 November 2012, Paulinho struck twice as Corinthians cruised to a 5–1 victory over Coritiba in the 35th round of league play. On 16 December, Paulinho and Corinthians won the Club World Cup in Yokohama as Paolo Guerrero scored the winner in the 1–0 victory over European champions Chelsea.

Tottenham Hotspur
On 6 July 2013, Premier League club Tottenham Hotspur confirmed the signing of Paulinho after he successfully completed his medical for a fee reported to be just under £17 million. This was the club's record transfer fee at the time. However, in the same transfer window, this record was broken twice with the signings of striker Roberto Soldado from Valencia and winger Erik Lamela from Roma for a deal worth an initial £25.8 million, plus up to £4.2 million in bonus payments. He made his Premier League debut on 18 August 2013 against Crystal Palace, eventually being named Man of the Match in which Tottenham won 1–0 away thanks to a Roberto Soldado penalty. On 22 August, he scored his first goal for the club in a Europa League qualification match against Dinamo Tbilisi, a 5–0 away victory in the first-leg. He scored his first goal for the club in the Premier League on 22 September 2013 against Cardiff City, a 1–0 away victory, with a backheel in the 92nd minute of the game.

Guangzhou Evergrande
On 30 June 2015, Paulinho joined Chinese Super League side Guangzhou Evergrande for €14 million (£9.9 million), signing a four-year deal. He was signed by his former international manager, Luiz Felipe Scolari. On 11 July 2015, he made his debut in a 2–0 away victory against Changchun Yatai, coming on as a substitute for Yu Hanchao in the 78th minute. On 25 August 2015, Paulinho scored his first goal for Guangzhou with a 35-yard free-kick in the first leg of a 2015 AFC Champions League knock-out stage match against Japanese side Kashiwa Reysol. On 13 December 2015, Paulinho scored a header against Club América in the third and final minute of the added-time in the quarter-final in the 2015 FIFA Club World Cup, making the game 2–1 and putting Evergrande into the semi-final. In January 2017, Paulinho extended his contract with Guangzhou until 31 December 2020.

Barcelona
On 14 August 2017, Barcelona announced a deal with Guangzhou Evergrande for the purchase of Paulinho for €40 million. According to Guangzhou Evergrande, Barcelona made several unsuccessful bids before activating his release clause. On 26 August 2017, he made his debut for Barcelona in a 2–0 win over Alavés, coming on for Andrés Iniesta in the 87th minute. On 16 September 2017, he scored his first goal for Barcelona in a 2–1 win over Getafe, after coming on for Ivan Rakitić in the 77th minute. On 28 October, Paulinho scored in a 2–0 win against Athletic Bilbao with a 92nd-minute goal. His consistent performance earned him a place as a starter in the squad. Paulinho ended the year with a brace against Deportivo de La Coruña. On 7 January, in Barcelona's first match of the year, Paulinho scored the third goal in a 3–0 win, scoring in injury time. On 15 January 2018, he scored the first goal in Barcelona's 4–2 win over Real Sociedad at the Anoeta Stadium that ended the club's 10-year long victory drought at the stadium.  On 9 May, Paulinho scored the second goal in Barcelona's 5–1 win over Villarreal. Paulinho received praise for his performances throughout the season; becoming one of Barcelona's key players as they won the domestic double. He finished the season with 9 goals in 49 appearances.

Return to Guangzhou Evergrande
On 8 July 2018, Guangzhou Evergrande re-signed Paulinho on a one-year loan deal. The club also agreed an option to purchase Paulinho after the loan expires. He made his return debut on 18 July, playing the whole match in a 4–0 home win over Guizhou Hengfeng. On 29 July, he scored on his second league match in a 5–0 home win over Chongqing Dangdai Lifan.

On 4 January 2019, Guangzhou Evergrande exercised the purchase option and signed Paulinho for €42 million.

On 21 June 2021, he was released from his contract after mutual agreement due to the COVID-19 pandemic.

Al-Ahli
On 22 July 2021, Paulinho joined Saudi Professional League side Al-Ahli. 

On 18 September 2021, he terminated his contract with the club, citing "inability to provide the desired addition to the team" as the reason.

International career

Early career

Paulinho made his debut for the Seleção on 14 September 2011 in the first leg of the 2011 Superclásico de las Américas against rivals Argentina in Córdoba, with the game ending in a goalless draw. His first goal for his international side came against Argentina a year later on 20 September 2012, when he netted Brazil's equalizing goal in an eventual 2–1 in the first leg of the 2012 Superclásico de las Américas.

2013 Confederations Cup

Paulinho was selected by Luiz Felipe Scolari for the 23-man Brazil squad for the 2013 FIFA Confederations Cup held in his home country. In Brazil's final warm-up match for the competition against England at the Maracanã on 2 June 2013, Paulinho volleyed home Lucas Moura's cross to level the game late on at 2–2; the sides would finish level on this same scoreline. In the opening group match on 15 June against Japan, Paulinho scored Brazil's second goal in a 3–0 victory. In the semi-final round against Uruguay on 26 June, Paulinho netted in the 86th minute to give Brazil a 2–1 win and book the host country a spot in the final. In the final, Brazil outclassed Spain, beating the World and two-time defending European champions by a score of 3–0. For his efforts throughout the tournament, Paulinho received the Bronze Ball as the competition's third best player.

2014 World Cup
Paulinho started in Brazil's 5–0 friendly win against South Africa on 5 March 2014. On 2 June, he was named in manager Scolari's 23-man squad that would participate at the 2014 World Cup on home soil. On 8 July, he appeared as a second-half substitute in the 7–1 semi-final defeat to eventual champions Germany. Four days later, he started in the bronze medal match against the Netherlands, which ended in a 3–0 loss.

2018 World Cup
In the qualifiers for the 2018 World Cup Paulinho scored his first ever career hat-trick in a match away against Uruguay. Brazil had initially gone behind but came back for their first time anyone had won in Uruguay since the qualifying round had started. In May 2018 he was named in Tite's final 23 man squad for the 2018 FIFA World Cup in Russia. On 27 June, he scored in Brazil's final group match, a 2–0 win over Serbia, to send his team through to the knock-out stages of the competition.

Style of play
A quick, hard-working, and energetic midfielder, Paulinho has been described as a box-to-box midfielder, with powerful running and good movement into the box. He also offers a useful presence in set piece situations at both ends of the pitch. Possessing good feet, physical strength, good ball-winning abilities, and an eye for goal from midfield, as well as a strong positional sense and an ability to start attacking plays after breaking down possession, he is a well-rounded player who is capable of playing in several midfield positions, and has also been used as a central or defensive midfielder.

Career statistics

Club

International
Appearances and goals by national team and year

Honours
Corinthians
 Campeonato Brasileiro Série A: 2011
 Campeonato Paulista: 2013
 Copa Libertadores: 2012
 FIFA Club World Cup: 2012

Guangzhou Evergrande
 Chinese Super League: 2015, 2016, 2019
 Chinese FA Cup: 2016
 Chinese FA Super Cup: 2016, 2017
 AFC Champions League: 2015

Barcelona
 La Liga: 2017–18
 Copa del Rey: 2017–18

Brazil
 Superclásico de las Américas: 2011, 2012
 FIFA Confederations Cup: 2013

Individual
 Campeonato Brasileiro Série A Team of the Year: 2011, 2012
 Bola de Prata: 2011, 2012
 FIFA Confederations Cup Bronze Ball: 2013
 FIFA Confederations Cup Team of the Tournament: 2013
 Chinese Super League Team of the Year: 2016, 2018, 2019
 Chinese Super League MVP: 2019

References

External links

FC Barcelona official profile

Living people
1988 births
Footballers from São Paulo
Brazilian footballers
Brazilian expatriate footballers
FC Vilnius players
ŁKS Łódź players
Clube Atlético Bragantino players
Sport Club Corinthians Paulista players
Tottenham Hotspur F.C. players
Guangzhou F.C. players
FC Barcelona players
Al-Ahli Saudi FC players
Campeonato Brasileiro Série A players
Ekstraklasa players
Premier League players
Chinese Super League players
A Lyga players
La Liga players
Saudi Professional League players
2013 FIFA Confederations Cup players
2014 FIFA World Cup players
2018 FIFA World Cup players
Expatriate footballers in Lithuania
Expatriate footballers in Poland
Expatriate footballers in England
Expatriate footballers in China
Expatriate footballers in Spain
Expatriate footballers in Saudi Arabia
Brazilian expatriate sportspeople in Lithuania
Brazilian expatriate sportspeople in Poland
Brazilian expatriate sportspeople in England
Brazilian expatriate sportspeople in China
Brazilian expatriate sportspeople in Spain
Brazilian expatriate sportspeople in Saudi Arabia
Brazil international footballers
Copa Libertadores-winning players
FIFA Confederations Cup-winning players
Association football midfielders